An election was held on November 6, 2012 to elect all 120 members to North Carolina's House of Representatives. The election coincided with elections for other offices, including Presidency, Governor, U.S. House of Representatives, and state senate. The primary election was held on May 8, 2012 with a primary run-off held on July 17, 2012.

Results summary

Incumbents defeated in primary election
Jim Crawford (D-District 32), lost a redistricting race to Winkie Wilkins (D-District 55) with the district renumbered as District 2
Efton Sager (R-District 11), lost a redistricting race to Jimmy Dixon (R-District 4) 
Stephen LaRoque (R-District 10), defeated by John Bell (R)
Darrell McCormick (R-District 92), lost a redistricting race to Mark Hollo (R-District 88) with the district renumbered as District 73
Larry Brown (R-District 73), lost to Debra Conrad (R) after his district was merged with the 74th district

Incumbents defeated in general election
Marian McLawhorn (D-District 9), defeated Brian Brown (R)
Gaston (G.L.) Pridgen (R-District 46), defeated by Ken Waddell (D)
Martha Alexander (D-District 106), defeated by Rob Bryan (R) with the district renumbered as District 88.
Ray Rapp (D-District 118), defeated by Michele Presnell (R)

Open seats that changed parties
Bill Owens (D-District 1) didn't seek re-election, seat won by Bob Steinburg (R)
Bill Cook (R-District 6) ran for the NC Senate, seat won by Paul Tine (D)
Edith Warren (D-District 8) didn't seek re-election, seat won by Susan Martin (R)
Frank McGuirt (D-District 69) didn't seek re-election, seat won by Mark Brody (R)with the district renumbered as District 55
Alice Bordsen (D-District 63) didn't seek re-election, seat won by Stephen Ross (R)
Patsy Keever (D-District 115) ran for the U.S House, seat won by Nathan Ramsey (R)

Newly created seats
District 20, won by Rick Catlin (R)
District 32, won by Nathan Baskerville (D)
District 35, won by Chris Malone (R)
District 38, won by Yvonne Lewis Holley (D)
District 45, won by John Szoka (R)
District 49, won by Jim Fulghum (R)
District 59, won by Jon Hardister (R)
District 69, won by Dean Arp (R)
District 84, won by Rena Turner (R)
District 92, won by Charles Jeter (R)
District 106, won by Carla Cunningham (D)

Seats eliminated by redistricting
Timothy Spear (D-District 2) didn't seek re-election after his seat was merged with the 6th district
Dewey Hill (D-District 20) didn't seek re-election after his seat was merged with the 46th district
Grier Martin (D-District 34) didn't seek re-election after the 38th district was merged with his 34th district
Dianne Parfitt (D-District 44) didn't seek re-election after the 45th district was merged with her 44th district
Glen Bradley (R-District 49) ran for the NC Senate after his seat was merged with the 25th district
Maggie Jeffus (D-District 59) didn't seek re-election after her seat was merged with the 57th district
Phillip Frye (R-District 84) didn't seek re-election after his seat was merged with 85th district

Detailed Results

Districts 1-19

District 1 
Incumbent Democrat Bill Owens has represented the 1st District since 1995. Owens didn't seek re-election and Republican Bob Steinburg won the open seat.

District 2 
The new 2nd district based in Person and Granville counties includes the homes of Incumbent Democrats Jim Crawford, who has represented the 32nd district and its predecessors since 1995, and Winkie Wilkins, who has represented the 55th district and its predecessors since 2005. Wilkins defeated Crawford in the Democratic primary and was re-elected to another term.

District 3 
Incumbent Republican Norman Sanderson has represented the 3rd district since 2011. Sanderson ran for the NC Senate. Republican Michael Speciale won the open seat.

District 4 
The new 4th district lost its share of Onslow County but gains portions of Wayne County. The new district includes the homes of incumbent Incumbent Republicans Jimmy Dixon, who has represented the 4th district since 2011, and Efton Sager, who has represented the 11th district since 2009. Dixon defeated Sager in the Republican primary and was easily elected to a second term.

District 5 
Incumbent Democrat Annie Mobley has represented the 5th district since 2007.

District 6 
The new 6th district includes the homes of Incumbent Republican Bill Cook, who has represented the 6th district 2011, and Democrat Timothy Spear, who has represented the 2nd district since 2006. Neither Cook nor Spear sought re-election here. Cook ran for the NC Senate. Democrat Paul Tine won the open seat.

District 7 
Incumbent Democrat Angela Bryant has represented the 7th district since 2007.

District 8 
Incumbent Democrat Edith Warren has represented the 8th district and its predecessors since 1999. Warren didn't seek re-election and Republican Susan Martin won the open seat.

District 9 
Incumbent Democrat Marian McLawhorn has represented the 9th district since 1999. McLawhorn lost re-election to Republican Brian Brown won the general election.

District 10 
Incumbent Republican Stephen LaRoque has represented the 10th district since 2011. LaRoque was defeated for re-nomination by John Bell. LaRoque resigned before the end of his term and Karen Kozel was appointed to fill the balance of his term. Bell won the general election to succeed Kozel.

District 11 
The new 11th district overlaps with much of the former 35th district and continues to favor Democrats. Incumbent Democrat Jennifer Weiss, who has represented the 35th district and its predecessors since 1999, didn't seek re-election. Democrat Duane Hall won the open seat.

District 12 
Incumbent Democrat Barbara Lee has represented the 12th district since her appointment in  August 2012. Lee didn't seek election to the seat and Democrat George Graham won the open seat.

District 13 
Incumbent Republican Pat McElraft has represented the 13th district since 2007.

District 14 
Incumbent Republican George Cleveland has represented the 14th district since 2005.

District 15 
Incumbent Republican Phil Shepard has represented the 15th district since 2011.

District 16 
Incumbent Republican Carolyn Justice has represented the 16th district since 2003. Justice didn't seek re-election and Republican Chris Millis won the open seat.

District 17 
Incumbent Republican Frank Iler has represented the 17th district since 2009.

District 18 
Incumbent Democrat Susi Hamilton has represented the 18th district since 2011.

District 19 
Incumbent Republican Ted Davis Jr. has represented the 19th district since his appointment in September 2012. Davis was elected to a full term.

Districts 20-39

District 20 
The new 20th district is based in New Hanover County and is expected to favor Republicans. Republican Rick Catlin won the open seat.

District 21 
Incumbent Democrat Larry Bell has represented the 21st district since 2001.

District 22 
Incumbent Democrat William Brisson has represented the 22nd district since 2007.

District 23 
Incumbent Democrat Joe Tolson has represented the 23rd district and its predecessors since 1997.

District 24 
Incumbent Democrat Jean Farmer-Butterfield has represented the 24th district since 2003.

District 25 
The new 25th district has been drawn to be more Republican than its predecessor and in addition to its share of Nash County it gained portions of Franklin County. Incumbent Republicans Jeff Collins, who has represented the 25th district since 2011, and Glen Bradley, who has represented the 49th district since 2011, were both redistricted here. Bradley sought the Republican nomination for NC Senate District 18, while Collins was re-elected here.

District 26 
Incumbent Republican Leo Daughtry has represented the 26th district and its predecessors since 1993.

District 27 
Incumbent Democrat Michael Wray has represented the 27th district since 2005.

District 28 
Incumbent Republican James Langdon Jr. has represented the 28th district since 2005.

District 29 
Incumbent Democrat Larry Hall has represented the 29th district since 2006.

District 30 
Incumbent Democrat Paul Luebke has represented the 30th district and its predecessors since 1991.

District 31 
Incumbent Democrat Mickey Michaux has represented the 31st district and its predecessors since 1983.

District 32 
The new 32nd district includes all of Warren and Vance counties as well as the northern portion of Granville County. The new district is expected to favor Democrats. Democrat Nathan Baskerville won the open seat.

District 33 
Incumbent Democrat Rosa Gill has represented the 33rd district since 2009.

District 34 
The new 34th district includes the homes of Incumbent Democrats Grier Martin, who has represented the 34th district since 2005, and Deborah Ross, who has represented the 38th district since 2003. Martin retired and Ross was re-elected here.

District 35 
The new 35th district is based in northern Wake County and isn't safe for either party. Republican Chris Malone won the open seat.

District 36 
Incumbent Republican Nelson Dollar has represented the 36th district since 2005.

District 37 
Incumbent Republican Paul Stam has represented the 37th district since 2003.

District 38 
The new 38th district continues to be based in Wake County and remains staunchly Democratic. Democrat Yvonne Lewis Holley won the open seat.

District 39 
Incumbent Democrat Darren Jackson has represented the 39th district since 2009.

Districts 40-59

District 40 
Incumbent Republican Marilyn Avila has represented the 40th district since 2007.

District 41 
Incumbent Republican Tom Murry has represented the 41st district since 2011.

District 42 
Incumbent Democrat Marvin Lucas has represented the 42nd district and its predecessors since 2001.

District 43 
Incumbent Democrat Elmer Floyd has represented the 43rd district since 2009.

District 44 
The new 44th district includes the homes Incumbent Democrats Dianne Parfitt, who has represented the 44th district since and Rick Glazier, who has represented the 45th district and its predecessors since 2003. Parfitt didn't seek re-election while Glazier was re-elected here.

District 45 
The new 45th district continues to based in Cumberland County but has been drawn to be more Republican than its predecessor. Republican John Szoka won the open seat.

District 46 
The new 46th district lost its share of Hoke and Scotland counties but gained all of Columbus County and a southwestern portion of Bladen County, North Carolina. The new district includes the homes of Incumbent Republican Gaston (G. L.) Pridgen, who has represented the 46th district since 2011, and Incumbent Democrat Dewey Hill, who has represented the 20th district and its predecessors since 1992. Hill didn't seek re-election. Pridgen ran for re-election but was defeated by Democrat Ken Waddell

District 47 
Incumbent Democrat Charles Graham has represented the 47th district since 2011.

District 48 
Incumbent Democrat Garland Pierce has represented the 48th district since 2005.

District 49 
The new 49th district is based in Wake County and isn't safe for either party. Republican Jim Fulghum won the open seat.

District 50 
Incumbent Democrat Bill Faison has represented the 50th district since 2005. Faison sought the Dmocratic nomination for Governor. Democrat Valerie Foushee won the open seat.

District 51 
Incumbent Republican Mike Stone has represented the 51st district since 2011.

District 52 
Incumbent Republican Jamie Boles has represented the 52nd district since 2009.

District 53 
Incumbent Republican David Lewis has represented the 53rd district since 2003.

District 54 
Incumbent Democratic Minority Leader Joe Hackney has represented the 54th district and its predecessors since 1981. Hackney didn't seek re-election. Democrat Deb McManus won the open seat.

District 55 
The new 55th district overlaps with much of the former 69th district. Incumbent Democrat Frank McGuirt, who has represented the 69th district since his appointment in March 2011, didn't seek re-election. Republican Mark Brody won the open seat.

District 56 
Incumbent Democrat Verla Insko has represented the 56th district and its predecessors since 1997.

District 57 
The new 57th district includes the homes of Incumbent Democrats Pricey Harrison, who has represented the 57th district since 2005, and Maggie Jeffus, who has represented the 59th district and its predecessors since 1991. Jeffus retired and Harrison was re-elected to another term unopposed.

District 58 
Incumbent Democrat Alma Adams has represented the 58th district and its predecessors since 1994.

District 59 
The new 59th district continues to be based in Guilford County but has been drawn to be favorable to Republicans. Republican Jon Hardister won the open seat.

Districts 60-79

District 60 
Incumbent Democrat Marcus Brandon has represented the 60th district since 2011.

District 61 
Incumbent Republican John Faircloth has represented the 61st District since 2011.

District 62 
Incumbent Republican John Blust has represented the 62nd District and its predecessors since 2001.

District 63 
Incumbent Democrat Alice Bordsen has represented the 63rd District since 2003. Bordsen didn't seek re-election and Republican Stephen Ross won the open seat.

District 64 
Incumbent Republican Dan Ingle has represented the 64th District since 2009. Republican Dennis Riddell won the open seat.

District 65 
Incumbent Republican Bert Jones has represented the 65th District since 2011.

District 66 
Incumbent Democrat Ken Goodman has represented the 66th District since 2011.

District 67 
Incumbent Republican Justin Burr has represented the 67th District since 2009.

District 68 
Incumbent Republican Craig Horn has represented the 68th District since 2011.

District 69 
The new 69th district is based in Union County and is expected to favor Republicans. Republican Dean Arp won the open seat.

District 70 
Incumbent Republican Pat Hurley has represented the 70th District since 2007.

District 71 
Incumbent Democrat Larry Womble has represented the 71st District and its predecessors since 1995. Womble didn't seek re-election and Democrat Evelyn Terry won the open seat.

District 72 
Incumbent Democrat Earline Parmon has represented the 72nd District since 2003. Parmon ran for the NC Senate District 32. Democrat Edward Hanes, Jr. won the open seat.

District 73 
The new 73rd district contains all of Alexander and Yadkin counties as well as a southeastern portion of Wilkes County. The new district includes the homes of incumbent Republicans Darrell McCormick, who has represented the 92nd district since 2009, and Mark Hollo, who has represented the 88th District since 2011. Hollo defeated McCormick in the Republican primary and easily won the general election.

District 74 
The new 74th district continues to be based in Forsyth County but has been pushed further to the south and to the east. The new district continues to favor Republicans. Incumbent Republican Dale Folwell, who has represented the 74th District since 2005, sought the Republican nomination for Lieutenant Governor. Incumbent Republican Larry Brown, who has represented the 73rd district since 2005, sought re-election here. Brown was defeated by Debra Conrad in the Republican primary. Conrad won the open seat.

District 75 
Incumbent Republican William McGee has represented the 75th District and its predecessors since 1990. McGee didn't seek re-election. Republican Donny Lambeth won the open seat.

District 76 
Incumbent Republican Fred Steen II has represented the 76th District since 2004. Steen sought the Republican nomination for U.S House NC District 8. Republican Carl Ford won the open seat.

District 77 
Incumbent Republican Harry Warren has represented the 77th District since 2011.

District 78 
Incumbent Republican Allen McNeill has represented the 78th District since his appointment in August 2012.  McNeill was elected to first full term.

District 79 
Incumbent Republican Julia Craven Howard has represented the 79th District and its predecessors since 1989.

Districts 80-99

District 80 
Incumbent Republican Jerry Dockham has represented the 80th district and its predecessors since 1991.

District 81 
Incumbent Republican Rayne Brown has represented the 81st District since 2011.

District 82 
Incumbent Republican Larry Pittman has represented the 82nd District since 2011.

District 83 
Incumbent Republican Linda Johnson has represented the 83rd District and its predecessors since 2001.

District 84 
The new 84th district is based in northern Iredell County and is expected to favor Republicans. Republican Rena Turner won the open seat.

District 85 
The new 85th district lost its share of Burke County but gained Avery and Mitchell counties. It includes the homes of Incumbent Republicans Mitch Gillespie, who has represented the 85th District since 1999, and Phillip Frye, who has represented the 84th district since 2003. Frye didn't seek re-election and Gillespie was re-elected here.

District 86 
Incumbent Republican Hugh Blackwell has represented the 86th District since 2009.

District 87 
Incumbent Republican Edgar Starnes has represented the 87th District and its predecessors since 1997.

District 88 
The new 88th district overlaps with much of the former 106th district but has been drawn to be more Republican than its predecessor. Incumbent Democrat Martha Alexander, who has represented the 106th District and its predecessors since 1993, was defeated for re-election here by Republican Rob Bryan.

District 89 
Incumbent Republican Mitchell Setzer has represented the 89th District and its predecessors since 1999.

District 90 
Incumbent Republican Sarah Stevens  has represented the 90th District since 2009.

District 91 
Incumbent Republican Bryan Holloway has represented the 91st District since 2005. Former Representative Nelson Cole attempted to make a political comeback after being defeated by Bert Jones in the neighboring 65th district in 2010, but he was easily defeated by Holloway.

District 92 
The new 92nd district is based in Mecklenburg County and isn't a safe seat for either party. Republican Charles Jeter won the open seat.

District 93 
Incumbent Republican Jonathan Jordan has represented the 93rd District since 2011. Former representative Cullie Tarleton sought a rematch with Jordan, but lost again in a close race.

District 94 
Incumbent Republican Shirley Randleman has represented the 94th District since 2009. Randleman ran for the NC Senate to replace Don East who died in office. Republican Jeffrey Elmore won the open seat.

District 95 
Incumbent Republican Grey Mills has represented the 95th District since 2009. Mills sought the Republican nomination for Lieutenant Governor. Republican Robert Brawley won the open seat.

District 96 
Incumbent Republican Mark Hilton has represented the 96th District and its predecessors since 2001. Hilton didn't seek re-election and Republican Andy Wells won the open seat.

District 97 
Incumbent Republican Jason Saine has represented the 97th District since 2011.

District 98 
Incumbent Republican Speaker of the House Thom Tillis has represented the 98th District since 2007.

District 99 
Incumbent Democrat Rodney Moore has represented the 99th District since 2011.

Districts 100-120

District 100 
Incumbent Democrat Tricia Cotham has represented the 100th District since 2007.

District 101 
Incumbent Democrat Beverley Earle has represented the 101st District and its predecessors since 1995.

District 102 
Incumbent Democrat Becky Carney has represented the 102nd District since 2003.

District 103 
Incumbent Republican Bill Brawley has represented the 103rd District since 2011.

District 104 
Incumbent Republican Ruth Samuelson has represented the 104th District since 2007.

District 105 
Incumbent Republican Ric Killian has represented the 105th District since 2006. Killian didn't seek re-election as he ran for the U.S House. Republican Jacqueline Schaffer won the open seat.

District 106 
The new 106th District continues to be based in Mecklenburg County and is expected to favor Democrats. Democrat Carla Cunningham won the open seat.

District 107 
Incumbent Democrat Kelly Alexander has represented the 107th District since 2009.

District 108 
Incumbent Republican John Torbett has represented the 108th District since 2011.

District 109 
Incumbent Republican William Current has represented the 109th District since 2005. Current didn't seek re-election and Republican Dana Bumgardner won the open seat.

District 110 
Incumbent Republican Kelly Hastings has represented the 110th District since 2011.

District 111 
Incumbent Republican Tim Moore has represented the 111th District since 2003.

District 112 
Incumbent Republican Mike Hager has represented the 112th District since 2011.

District 113 
Incumbent Republican Trudi Walend has represented the 113th District since her appointment in 2012. Walend ran for a full term, but she lost re-nomination to fellow Republican Chris Whitmire. Whitmire easily won the general election.

District 114 
Incumbent Democrat Susan Fisher has represented the 114th District since 2004.

District 115 
Incumbent Democrat Patsy Keever has represented the 115th District since 2010. Keever ran for the U.S House. Republican Nathan Ramsey won the open seat.

District 116 
Incumbent Republican Tim Moffitt has represented the 116th District since 2011. Former Representative Jane Whilden sought a rematch with Moffitt but she was defeated again.

District 117 
Incumbent Republican Chuck McGrady has represented the 117th District since 2011.

District 118 
Incumbent Democrat Ray Rapp has represented the 118th District since 2003. Rapp lost re-election to Republican Michele Presnell.

District 119 
Incumbent Democrat Phil Haire has represented the 119th District and its predecessors since 1999. Haire didn't seek re-election and former Democratic state senator Joe Queen won the open seat.

District 120 
Incumbent Republican Roger West has represented the 120th District and its predecessors since 2000.

References

North Carolina House of Representatives
House of Representatives
2012